TV Chosun (Hanja: 株式會社朝鮮放送; Jusikhoesa Joseon Bangsong; literally "Company Korea Broadcasting"), stylised as TV CHOSUN, is a South Korean pay television network and broadcasting company, owned by the Chosun Ilbo-led consortium. It began broadcasting on 1 December 2011.

TV Chosun is one of four new South Korean nationwide generalist cable TV networks alongside JoongAng Ilbo's JTBC, Dong-A Ilbo's Channel A, and Maeil Kyungje's MBN in 2011. The four new networks supplement existing conventional free-to-air TV networks like KBS, MBC, SBS, and other smaller channels launched following deregulation in 1990.

History 
 22 July 2009 - Amendment of Media law passed the South Korean national assembly to deregulate the media market of South Korea.
 31 December 2010 - JTBC, TV Chosun, MBN, and Channel A elected as a General Cable Television Channel Broadcasters.
 1 December 2011 – TV Chosun begins broadcasting.

See also 
 JTBC
 MBN

References

External links 
  

Broadcasting companies of South Korea
Conservative media in South Korea
Television channels in South Korea
Television channels and stations established in 2009